John Alan Lasseter (born January 12, 1957) is an American film director, producer, screenwriter, animator, voice actor, and the head of animation at Skydance Animation. He was previously the chief creative officer of Pixar Animation Studios, Walt Disney Animation Studios, and Disneytoon Studios, as well as the Principal Creative Advisor for Walt Disney Imagineering.

Lasseter began his career as an animator with The Walt Disney Company. After being fired from Disney for promoting computer animation, he joined Lucasfilm, where he worked on then-groundbreaking use of CGI animation. The Graphics Group of the Computer Division of Lucasfilm was sold to Steve Jobs and became Pixar in 1986. Lasseter oversaw all of Pixar's films and associated projects as executive producer. In addition, he directed Toy Story (1995), A Bug's Life (1998), Toy Story 2 (1999), Cars (2006), and Cars 2 (2011). From 2006 to 2018, Lasseter also oversaw all of Walt Disney Animation Studios' (and its division Disneytoon Studios') films and associated projects as executive producer.

The films he has made have grossed more than 19 billion, making him one of the most successful filmmakers of all time. Of the eight animated films that have grossed more than $1 billion, five of them are films executive produced by Lasseter. The films include Toy Story 3 (2010), the first animated film to pass $1 billion, Frozen (2013), the third highest-grossing animated film of all time, as well as Zootopia (2016), Finding Dory (2016), and Incredibles 2 (2018). Frozen also held the title of the highest grossing animated film of all time until 2019, and was the fifth highest grossing film of all time at the end of its theatrical run. He has won two Academy Awards, for Best Animated Short Film (for Tin Toy), as well as a Special Achievement Award (for Toy Story).

In November 2017, Lasseter took a six-month sabbatical from Pixar and Disney Animation after acknowledging what he called "missteps" in his behavior with employees. According to various news outlets, Lasseter had a history of alleged sexual misconduct toward employees. In June 2018, Disney announced that he would be leaving the company at the end of the year when his contract expired, but took on a consulting role until then. On January 9, 2019, Lasseter was hired to run Skydance Animation.

Early life
John Alan Lasseter was born January 12, 1957, in Hollywood, California. His mother, Jewell Mae (née Risley; 1918–2005), was an art teacher at Bell Gardens High School, and his father, Paul Eual Lasseter (1924–2011), was a parts manager at a Chevrolet dealership.

Lasseter is a fraternal twin; his sister Johanna Lasseter-Curtis, who became a baker based in the Lake Tahoe area, is six minutes older.

Lasseter grew up in Whittier, California. His mother's profession contributed to his growing preoccupation with animation. He often drew cartoons during church services at the Church of Christ church his family attended. As a child, Lasseter would race home from school to watch Chuck Jones cartoons on television. While in high school, he read The Art of Animation by Bob Thomas. The book covered the history of Disney animation and explored the making of Disney's 1959 film Sleeping Beauty, which made Lasseter realize he wanted to do animation himself. When he saw Disney's 1963 film The Sword in the Stone, he finally made the decision that he should become an animator. He then read Preston Blair's book about animation, and made flipbooks based on Blair's walk cycles. One of his friends had a Super 8 camera that shot single frames, which was used to shoot some of his earlier animation efforts.

Lasseter heard of a new character animation program at the California Institute of the Arts (often abbreviated as 'CalArts') and decided to follow his dream of becoming an animator. His mother further encouraged him to take up a career in animation, and in 1975 he enrolled as the second student (Jerry Rees was the first) in the CalArts Character Animation program created by Disney animators Jack Hannah and T. Hee. Lasseter was taught by three members of Disney's Nine Old Men team of veteran animators—Eric Larson, Frank Thomas and Ollie Johnston—and his classmates included future animators and directors like Brad Bird, John Musker, Henry Selick, Tim Burton, and Chris Buck. During his time there, he produced two animated shorts—Lady and the Lamp (1979) and Nitemare (1980)—which each won the student Academy Award for Animation.

While at CalArts, Lasseter first started working for the Walt Disney Company at Disneyland in Anaheim during summer breaks and got a job as a Jungle Cruise skipper, where he learned the basics of comedy and comic timing to entertain captive audiences on the ride.

Career

First years at Disney
Upon graduating in 1979, Lasseter immediately obtained a job as an animator at Walt Disney Productions mostly due to his success with his student project, Lady and the Lamp. The studio had reviewed approximately 10,000 portfolios in the late 1970s in search of talent, then selected only about 150 candidates as apprentices, of which only about 45 were kept on permanently. In the fall of 1979, Disney animator Mel Shaw told the Los Angeles Times that "John's got an instinctive feel for character and movement and shows every indication of blossoming here at our studios ... In time, he'll make a fine contribution." At that same time, Lasseter worked on a sequence titled "The Emperor and the Nightingale" (based on The Nightingale by Hans Christian Andersen) for a Disney project called Musicana. Musicana was never released but eventually led to the development of Fantasia 2000 (1999).

However, Lasseter soon felt that something was missing: after 101 Dalmatians (1961), which in his opinion was the film where Disney had reached its highest plateau, he felt that the studio had lost momentum and was often repeating itself.  Between 1980 and 1981, he coincidentally came across some video tapes from one of the then new computer-graphics conferences, who showed some of the very beginnings of computer animation, primarily floating spheres and such, which he experienced as a revelation. But it was not until shortly after, when he was invited by his friends Jerry Rees and Bill Kroyer, while working on Mickey's Christmas Carol (1983), to come and see the first light cycle sequences for an upcoming film entitled Tron (1982), featuring state-of-the-art computer-generated imagery (CGI), that he saw the huge potential of this new technology in animation. Up to that time, the studio had used a multiplane camera to add depth to its animation. Lasseter realized that computers could be used to make films with three-dimensional backgrounds where traditionally animated characters could interact to add a new level of visually stunning depth that had not been possible before. He knew adding dimension to animation had been a longtime dream of animators, going back to Walt Disney.

Later, he and Glen Keane talked about how great it would be to make an animated feature where the background was computer animated, and then showed Keane the book The Brave Little Toaster by Thomas Disch, which he thought would be a good candidate for the film. Keane agreed, but first, they decided to do a short test film to see how it worked out and chose Where the Wild Things Are, a decision based on the fact that Disney had considered producing a feature based on the works of Maurice Sendak. Satisfied with the result, Lasseter, Keane and executive Thomas L. Wilhite went on with the project, especially Lasseter who dedicated himself to it, while Keane eventually went on to work with The Great Mouse Detective (1986).

Lasseter and his colleagues unknowingly stepped on some of their direct superiors' toes by circumventing them in their enthusiasm to get the Where the Wild Things Are project into motion. The project was canceled while being pitched to two of Lasseter's supervisors, animation administrator Ed Hansen, and head of Disney studios, Ron W. Miller, due to lack of perceived cost benefits for the mix of traditional and computer animation. A few minutes after the meeting, Lasseter was summoned by Hansen to his office. As Lasseter recalled, Hansen told him, "Well, John, your project is now complete, so your employment with the Disney Studios is now terminated." Wilhite, who was part of Disney's live-action group and therefore had no obligations to the animation studio, was able to arrange to keep Lasseter around temporarily until the Wild Things test project was complete in January 1984, but with the understanding there would be no further work for Lasseter at Disney Animation. The Brave Little Toaster would later become a 2D animated feature film directed by one of Lasseter's friends, Jerry Rees, and co-produced by Wilhite (who had, by then, left to start Hyperion Pictures), and some of the staff of Pixar would be involved in the film alongside Lasseter.

Lucasfilm/Pixar

While putting together a crew for the planned feature, Lasseter had made some contacts in the computer industry, among them Alvy Ray Smith and Ed Catmull at Lucasfilm Computer Graphics Group. After being fired, and feeling glum knowing his employment with Disney was to end shortly, Lasseter visited a computer graphics conference in November 1983 at the Queen Mary in Long Beach, where he met and talked to Catmull again. Catmull inquired about The Brave Little Toaster, which Lasseter explained had been shelved. From his experience at Lucasfilm, Catmull assumed Lasseter was simply between projects since Hollywood studios have traditionally laid off employees when they lack enough productions to keep them busy. Still devastated at being forced out of the only company he had ever wanted to work for, Lasseter could not find the strength to tell Catmull that he had been fired.

Catmull later telephoned Smith that day and mentioned that Lasseter was not working at Disney. Smith told Catmull to put down the phone and hire Lasseter right now. Lasseter agreed instantly to work freelance with Catmull and his colleagues and joined them for a week of December 1983 on a project that resulted in their first computer animated short: The Adventures of André & Wally B., meant to prove it was possible to do character animation on a computer. After his work on the Where the Wild Things Are-test, Lasseter assumed hand-drawn characters in a CGI environment was the only way, but Catmull insisted it could be done, it was just that nobody had given it an attempt before. Because Catmull was not allowed to hire animators, he was given the title "Interface Designer"; "Nobody knew what that was but they didn't question it in budget meetings". Lasseter spent a lot of time at Lucasfilm in the San Francisco Bay Area in the spring of 1984, where he worked together closely with Catmull and his team of computer science researchers. Lasseter learned how to use some of their software, and in turn, he taught the computer scientists about filmmaking, animation, and art.  The short turned out to be more revolutionary than Lasseter first had visualized before he came to Lucasfilm. His original idea had been to create only the backgrounds on computers, but in the final short everything was computer animated, including the characters.

After the short CGI film was presented at SIGGRAPH in the summer of 1984, Lasseter returned to Los Angeles with the hope of directing The Brave Little Toaster at Hyperion Pictures.  He soon learned that funding had fallen through and called Catmull with the bad news.  Catmull called back with a job offer, and Lasseter joined Lucasfilm as a full-time employee in October 1984 and moved to the Bay Area. After that, he worked with ILM on the special effects on Young Sherlock Holmes, where he made the first fully computer-generated photorealistic animated character, a knight composed of elements from a stained glass window. This effect was the first CGI character to be scanned and painted directly onto film using a laser. Lasseter and Catmull's collaboration, which has since lasted over thirty years, would ultimately result in Toy Story (1995), which was the first-ever computer-animated feature film. Additionally, Lasseter created THX's robot mascot Tex. He made his first appearance in 1996 with the original theatrical release of Independence Day. Since then, Tex has appeared in some THX trailers.

Due to George Lucas's financially crippling divorce, he was forced to sell off Lucasfilm Computer Graphics, by this time renamed the Pixar Graphics Group, founded by Smith and Catmull, with Lasseter as one of the founding employees. It was spun off as a separate corporation with Steve Jobs as its majority shareholder in 1986. Over the next 10 years, Pixar evolved from a computer company that did animation work on the side into an animation studio. Lasseter oversaw all of Pixar's films and associated projects as executive producer. As well as Toy Story, he also personally directed A Bug's Life (1998), Toy Story 2 (1999), Cars (2006), and Cars 2 (2011).

He has won two Academy Awards, for Animated Short Film (Tin Toy), as well as a Special Achievement Award (Toy Story). Lasseter has been nominated on four other occasions—in the category of Animated Feature, for both Monsters, Inc. (2001) and Cars, in the Original Screenplay category for Toy Story and in the Animated Short category for Luxo, Jr. (1986)—while the short Knick Knack (1989) was selected by Terry Gilliam as one of the ten best animated films of all time. In 2008, he was honored with the Winsor McCay Award, the lifetime achievement award for animators.

Return to Disney 

Disney announced that it would be purchasing Pixar in January 2006, and Lasseter was named the chief creative officer of both Pixar and Walt Disney Feature Animation, the latter of which he renamed Walt Disney Animation Studios. Lasseter was also named principal creative adviser at Walt Disney Imagineering, where he helped design attractions for Disney Parks. He oversaw all of Walt Disney Animation Studios' films and associated projects as executive producer. He reported directly to Disney Chairman and CEO Bob Iger, bypassing Disney's studio and theme park executives. He also received green-light power on films with Roy E. Disney's consent.

In December 2006, Lasseter announced that Disney Animation would start producing animated shorts – 2D, CGI, or a combination of both – that would be released theatrically. Lasseter said he sees this medium as an excellent way to train and discover new talent in the company as well as a testing ground for new techniques and ideas.

In June 2007, Catmull and Lasseter were given control of Disneytoon Studios, a division of Walt Disney Animation Studios housed in a separate facility in Glendale. As president and chief creative officer, respectively, they have supervised three separate studios for Disney, each with its own production pipeline: Pixar, Disney Animation, and Disneytoon. While Disney Animation and Disneytoon are located in the Los Angeles area, Pixar is located over 350 miles (563 kilometers) northwest in the Bay Area, where Catmull and Lasseter both live. Accordingly, they appointed a general manager for each studio to manage day-to-day business affairs, then established a routine of spending at least two days per week (usually Tuesdays and Wednesdays) in Southern California.

Lasseter is a close friend and admirer of Japanese animator Hayao Miyazaki, whom he first met when TMS Entertainment sent a delegation of animators to the Disney studio in 1981 and showed a clip from Miyazaki's first feature film, The Castle of Cagliostro (1979). Lasseter was so deeply moved that in 1985 he insisted on showing that clip and other examples of Miyazaki's work after dinner to a woman he had just met (who would become his wife).  He visited Miyazaki during his first trip to Japan in 1987 and saw drawings for My Neighbor Totoro (1988).  After Lasseter became a successful director and producer at Pixar, he went on to serve as executive producer on several of Miyazaki's films for their release in the United States and oversaw the translation and dubbing of their English language soundtracks. In addition, the forest spirit Totoro from My Neighbor Totoro makes an appearance as a plush toy in Toy Story 3 (2010).

Lasseter is a member of the Academy of Motion Picture Arts and Sciences and served nine consecutive years on its board of governors from 2005 to 2014 when he had to relinquish his seat due to term limits.  His last position on the board was as first vice president.

Lasseter received a star on the Hollywood Walk of Fame in Hollywood in 2011, located at 6834 Hollywood Boulevard.

Exit from Disney/Pixar
In November 2017, Lasseter took a six-month leave of absence after acknowledging allegations of workplace sexual misconduct that he described as "missteps" with employees in a memo to staff. The alleged misconduct toward employees included "grabbing, kissing, [and] making comments about physical attributes". The alleged conduct became so well-known that, according to Variety, at various times, Pixar had "minders who were tasked with reining in his impulses".

In June 2018, Disney announced that Lasseter was leaving the company at the end of the year, taking a consulting role until then.

Skydance Animation
On January 9, 2019, Lasseter was hired to head Skydance Animation, which will produce animated films with Paramount Animation and Ilion Animation Studios. In a statement, Lasseter said "I have spent the last year away from the industry in deep reflection, learning how my actions unintentionally made colleagues uncomfortable, which I deeply regret and apologize for. It has been humbling, but I believe it will make me a better leader." An investigation conducted prior to his hiring found that no previous claims of sexual assault, propositioning or harassment had been filed against Lasseter, and "[...] there were no findings of secret settlements by Disney or Lasseter to any parties asking for a settlement."

Personal life

Lasseter lives in Glen Ellen, California with his wife Nancy, a graduate of Carnegie Mellon University, whom he met at a computer graphics conference in San Francisco in 1985. Nancy majored in computer graphics applications, and for a short period of time was a stay at home mother and worked as a computer graphics engineer at Apple Computer.

The Lasseters own Lasseter Family Winery in Glen Ellen, California. Their residence has a swimming pool with a lazy river that runs through a cave. Lasseter owns a collection of more than 1,000 Hawaiian shirts and wears one every day. Lasseter also inherited his late father's passion for cars; besides having directed two films about them, he watches auto races at Sonoma Raceway near his home and collects classic cars, of which one of his favorites is his black 1952 Jaguar XK120.

On May 2, 2009, Lasseter received an honorary doctorate from Pepperdine University, where he delivered the commencement address.

His influences include Walt Disney, Chuck Jones, Frank Capra, Hayao Miyazaki, and Preston Sturges. Lasseter's favorite film is Walt Disney's Dumbo (1941).

Filmography

Films
{| class="wikitable"
! rowspan="2"|Year
! rowspan="2"|Film
! colspan="6"|Credited as
|-
! Director
! (Original)Story by
! Producer
! Other
! Voice
! Notes
|-
| 1981
| The Fox and the Hound
| 
| 
| 
| 
| 
| Animator - uncredited   
|-
| 1985
| Young Sherlock Holmes
| 
| 
| 
| 
| 
| Computer Animation: Industrial Light & Magic
|-
| 1995
| Toy Story
| 
| 
| 
| 
| Commercial Chorus 1
| Modeling and Animation System Development
|-
| 1998
| A Bug's Life
| 
| 
| 
| 
| HarrySinging Grasshopper 1
| 
|-
| 1999
| Toy Story 2
| 
| 
| 
| 
| Blue Bomber
| 
|-
| 2001
| Monsters, Inc.
| 
| 
| 
| 
|
| 
|-
| 2002
| Spirited Away
| 
| 
| 
| 
|
| US Version
|-
| 2003
| Finding Nemo
| 
| 
| 
| 
|
| 
|-
| 2004
| The Incredibles
| 
| 
| 
| 
|
|
|-
| rowspan="2" | 2005
| Howl's Moving Castle
| 
| 
| 
| 
|
| US Version
|-
| Porco Rosso
| 
| 
| 
| 
|
| Executive Creative Consultant: 2005 US Version
|-
| rowspan="2"| 2006
| Cars
| 
| 
| 
| 
|
| Screenplay
|-
| Tales from Earthsea
| 
| 
| 
| 
|
| US Version
|-
| rowspan="2"| 2007
| Meet the Robinsons
| 
| 
| 
| 
| 
| 
|-
| Ratatouille
| 
| 
| 
| 
|
| Executive Team
|-
| rowspan="3"| 2008
| WALL-E
| 
| 
| 
| 
|
| Pixar Senior Creative Team
|-
| Tinker Bell
| 
| 
| 
| 
|
| 
|-
| Bolt
| 
| 
| 
| 
|
|
|-
| rowspan="4"| 2009
| Up
| 
| 
| 
| 
| 
| Pixar Senior Creative Team
|-
| Ponyo
| 
| 
| 
| 
|
| Director: English Dub, US Version
|-
| Tinker Bell and the Lost Treasure
| 
| 
| 
| 
|
| 
|-
| The Princess and the Frog
| 
| 
| 
| 
| 
|
|-
| rowspan="3"| 2010
| Toy Story 3
| 
| 
| 
| 
|
|  Pixar Senior Creative Team
|-
| Tinker Bell and the Great Fairy Rescue
| 
| 
| 
| 
|
| 
|-
| Tangled
| 
| 
| 
| 
|
| rowspan="2"| Studio Leadership
|-
| rowspan="4"| 2011
| Winnie the Pooh
| 
| 
| 
| 
|
|-
| Cars 2
| 
| 
| 
| 
| Galloping GeargrinderJohn LassetireFuzzy Dice Casino Car
| Pixar Senior Creative Team
|-
| The Lion King
| 
| 
| 
| 
| 
| rowspan="2"| 3D Version
|-
| Beauty and the Beast
| 
| 
| 
| 
| 
|-
| rowspan="3"| 2012
| Brave
| 
| 
| 
| 
|
| Pixar Senior Creative Team
|-
| Secret of the Wings
| 
| 
| 
| 
|
| 
|-
| Wreck-It Ralph
| 
| 
| 
| 
|
| Studio Leadership
|-
| rowspan="4"| 2013
| Monsters University
| 
| 
| 
| 
|
| Pixar Senior Creative Team
|-
| Planes
| 
| 
| 
| 
|
|
|-
| The Little Mermaid
| 
| 
| 
| 
|
| 3D Version
|-
| Frozen
| 
| 
| 
| 
|
| Studio Leadership
|-
| rowspan="4"| 2014
| The Pirate Fairy
| 
| 
| 
| 
|
| 
|-
| Planes: Fire & Rescue
| 
| 
| 
| 
|
| 
|-
| Big Hero 6
| 
| 
| 
| 
|
| Studio Leadership
|- 
| Tinker Bell and the Legend of the NeverBeast
| 
| 
| 
| 
| 
| 
|-
| rowspan="2"| 2015
| Inside Out
| 
| 
| 
| 
|
| rowspan="2"| Pixar Senior Creative Team
|-
| The Good Dinosaur
| 
| 
| 
| 
|
|-
| rowspan="3"| 2016
| Zootopia
| 
| 
| 
| 
|
| Studio Leadership
|-
| Finding Dory
| 
| 
| 
| 
|
|  Pixar Senior Creative Team
|-
| Moana
| 
| 
| 
| 
|
| Studio Leadership
|-
| rowspan="2"| 2017
| Cars 3
| 
| 
| 
| 
|
| rowspan="3"| Pixar Senior Creative Team
|-
| Coco
| 
| 
| 
| 
|
|-
| rowspan="2"| 2018
| Incredibles 2
| 
| 
| 
| 
|
|-
| Ralph Breaks the Internet
| 
| 
| 
| 
| 
| Studio Leadership - uncredited 
|-
| 2019
|Toy Story 4
| 
| 
| 
| 
|
|
|-
| 2022
| Luck
| 
| 
| 
| 
|
| rowspan="2"| 
|-
| 2023
| Spellbound
| 
| 
| 
| 
|
|-
| rowspan="2"| TBA
| Pookoo (TBD film)|Pookoo| 
| 
| 
| 
|
| 
|-
| Ray Gunn| 
| 
| 
| 
|
| 
|-
|}

Shorts

TV specials and series

Documentaries

Other credits

Reception
Critical, public and commercial reception to films Lasseter has directed as of August 9, 2022.

See also

A113
List of Pixar films
List of Pixar shorts
List of celebrities who own wineries and vineyards

References

External links

 
 
 Richard Verrier and Dawn C. Chmielewski, Fabled Film Company May Get a Reanimator, Los Angeles Times'', January 25, 2006
 Fortune Magazine interview with John Lasseter – includes biographic information
 KCRW's The Treatment: John Lasseter and Andrew Stanton (02/04) 
 KCRW's The Treatment: John Lasseter (06/06) 

1957 births
Animators from California
American male screenwriters
American animated film directors
American animated film producers
American chief executives in the media industry
Animation screenwriters
California Institute of the Arts alumni
Directors of Best Animated Short Academy Award winners
Walt Disney Animation Studios people
Walt Disney Parks and Resorts people
Disney executives
Living people
People from Whittier, California
Pixar people
Inkpot Award winners
Primetime Emmy Award winners
Special Achievement Academy Award winners
Computer animation people
Film directors from Los Angeles
Annie Award winners
Student Academy Award winners
People from Glen Ellen, California
Lucasfilm people
Pixar
Skydance Media people
Screenwriters from California
Toy collectors
American storyboard artists